The 1987 Edmonton Eskimos finished in 2nd place in the West Division with an 11–7 record and defeated the Toronto Argonauts to win the 75th Grey Cup.

Pre-season

Schedule

Regular season

Season standings

Season schedule

Total attendance: 302,230 
Average attendance: 33,581 (55.9%)

Playoffs

Grey Cup

Awards and honours
Dick Suderman Trophy – Milson Jones
Grey Cup Most Valuable Player (Offence) – Damon Allen
Grey Cup Most Valuable Player (Defence) – Stewart Hill
Jeff Nicklin Memorial Trophy – Brian Kelly

References

Edmonton Elks seasons
Grey Cup championship seasons
N. J. Taylor Trophy championship seasons
1987 Canadian Football League season by team